Tonnerre d'Abomey FC are a Beninese football club based in Abomey. They currently play in the Benin Premier League.

Former players

  Franck Gnahoui

Achievements
Benin Premier League: 1
2007

Performance in CAF competitions
CAF Champions League: 2 appearances
2008 – Preliminary Round
2012 –

 
Football clubs in Benin